Arthur's Treasured Volumes was a black-and-white British television series that aired on ITV in 1960. Starring Arthur Askey, it was written by Dave Freeman and was made for the ITV network by ATV.

All six episodes were missing having been presumed wiped during the 1960s, until part of the first episode "A Blow In Anger" was recovered by Paul Stroud and shown at the National Film Theatre in November 2003. The remaining episodes were re-discovered in ITV's archive by a researcher from archive television organisation Kaleidoscope in December 2019.

Cast
Arthur Askey - Various
Anthea Askey - Herself/narrator
Sam Kydd - Various
Arthur Mullard - Various
Roger Avon - Various 
Tony Sampson - Various
Paddi Edwards - Various 
Billy Tasker - Various
Barbara Mitchell - Various
Wilfrid Brambell - Various
Patrick Newell - Various
June Whitfield - Enid Brown
Janet Davies - Miss Tiddy
David Garth - Hamlet

Plot
Arthur's Treasured Volumes was a series of one-episode sitcoms. At the beginning of each episode, Anthea Askey, Arthur's daughter, takes down a book from a shelf and the story begins. All the 'books' are in fact scripts written by Dave Freeman. In each episode, Arthur Askey, Sam Kydd and Arthur Mullard play different roles. Amongst those who made guest appearances were Wilfrid Brambell, Patrick Newell, June Whitfield and Geoffrey Palmer.

Episodes
"A Blow In Anger" (2 May 1960)
"The History of Mr Lacey" (9 May 1960)
"The Command Performer" (16 May 1960)
"Pilbeam of Twickenham" (23 May 1960)
"A Slight Case of Deception" (30 May 1960)
"The Curse of the Bellfoots" (6 June 1960)

References
Mark Lewisohn, "Radio Times Guide to TV Comedy", BBC Worldwide Ltd, 2003
British TV Comedy Guide for Arthur's Treasured Volumes

External links 
 

1960 British television series debuts
1960 British television series endings
1960s British sitcoms
ITV sitcoms